Umberto Romano (born 6 January 1973) is a retired Swiss football player of Italian descent and current assistant coach of FC Lausanne-Sport.

Career

Club career
Romano began his career at FC Zürich for whom he played three times in the 1991/92 season, then played for FC Wettingen before returning to Zürich to play three times for the club. He then played for FC St. Gallen, FC Baden, FC Locarno, FC Winterthur and SR Delémont . He then played for FC Wil, with whom he was promoted to the Swiss Super League (formerly named Nationalliga A) and contributed two goals to the highest-scoring game in the highest Swiss league. Then played at FC Malcantone Agno. Finally, he played a total of five seasons at FC Winterthur, including being a captain there. In 2009 he moved to FC Linth 04, then played for one season at FC Küsnacht, before retiring.

Coaching career
On 2 June 2009 was named as the new player-coach of FC Linth 04. He was in charge until the summer 2011, where he joined FC Küsnacht, also as a player-coach. In the summer 2012, he became assistant coach of FC Wohlen, which he was until the summer 2015.

In the summer 2015, Romano returned to FC Winterthur as head coach for the club's U18 team. On 27 November 2015, he was also appointed interim head coach of Winterthur's first team, following the departure of Jürgen Seeberger. He was replaced at the end of the year with two victories in two games and continued in his position as U18 coach. He took charge of the club's first team once again in February 2017, this time on an permanent basis. He was fired on 18 December 2017.

In June 2018, Romano was appointed assistant manager of

References

External links
Football.ch profile

1973 births
Living people
Swiss men's footballers
FC Zürich players
FC St. Gallen players
FC Baden players
FC Locarno players
FC Winterthur players
SR Delémont players
FC Wil players
Swiss Super League players
Swiss Challenge League players
Swiss people of Italian descent
Association football central defenders
Place of birth missing (living people)
Swiss football managers
FC Winterthur managers